Murder, as defined in common law countries, is the unlawful killing  of another human being with intent (or malice aforethought), and generally this state of mind distinguishes murder from other forms of unlawful homicide (such as manslaughter). As the loss of a human being inflicts an enormous amount of grief for individuals close to the victim, as well as the fact that the commission of a murder permanently deprives the victim of their existence, most societies have considered it a very serious crime warranting the harshest punishments available. A person who commits murder is called a murderer, and the penalties, as outlined below, vary from state to state. 

In 2005, the United States Supreme Court held that offenders under the age of 18 at the time of the murder was exempt from the death penalty under Roper v. Simmons.

In 2012, the United States Supreme Court held in Miller v. Alabama that mandatory sentences of life without the possibility of parole are unconstitutional for juvenile offenders.

Federal

Civilian
Source:

Military
Source:

District of Columbia
Source:

Puerto Rico

U.S. Virgin Islands
Source:

By states

Alabama
Source:

Alaska
Source:

Arizona
Source:

Arkansas
Source:

California
Source:

Excluding murder, all offense below are eligible for probation terms. If probation is given, the maximum confinement sentence is up to a year in jail with up to five years of probation. If probation is denied, the following prison terms are used:

Colorado

Connecticut

Delaware

Florida
Source:

Georgia

Hawaii

Idaho

Illinois

Indiana

Iowa

Kansas

Kentucky

Louisiana
Source:

Maine
Source:

Maryland

Massachusetts

Michigan
Source:

Minnesota

Mississippi

Source:

Missouri

Montana

Nebraska

Nevada
Under Assembly Bill 267, juveniles must have parole eligibility begin after 20 years if only one death occurred. Nevada does not have guidelines on when to offer parole if more than one person was killed. But, the judge would apply the same as if it was just one victim.

New Hampshire
Source:

New Jersey

New Mexico

New York

North Carolina

North Dakota

Ohio
Ohio differentiates between "Aggravated Murder (First-Degree Murder)" and "Murder (Second-Degree Murder)."  Aggravated Murder consists of purposely causing the death of another (or unlawful termination of a pregnancy) with prior calculation and design, or purposely causing the death of another under the age of 13, a law enforcement officer, or in the course of committing certain serious felony offenses.  Murder consists of purposely causing the death of another, or causing the death of another as a proximate result of committing certain serious felony offenses.

Oklahoma
(life with and without parole are eligible for reduction after 38 years)

Oregon
Sources:

Pennsylvania

Rhode Island

South Carolina

South Dakota

Tennessee

Texas

Utah

Vermont
Source:

Virginia

Washington
Sources:

West Virginia
Source:

Wisconsin

Wyoming
Source:

References

Bibliography
 Lord Mustill on the Common Law concerning murder
 Sir Edward Coke Co. Inst., Pt. III, ch.7, p. 50

External links

 1986 Seville Statement on Violence (from UNESCO)
 Introduction and Updated Information on the Seville Statement on Violence
 U.S. Centers for Disease Control "Atlas of United States Mortality"
 Cezanne's depiction of "

Capital punishment in the United States
United States law-related lists